Aurora is a 2010 Romanian film written and directed by Cristi Puiu, who also plays the main character. Producer Anca Puiu has described the plot as a "crime story from a new perspective." It is the second installment in Puiu's planned suite "Six Stories from the Outskirts of Bucharest", the first being The Death of Mr. Lazarescu from 2005. It was screened in the Un Certain Regard section at the 2010 Cannes Film Festival.

Cast
 Cristi Puiu as Viorel
 Clara Vodă as Gina
 Valeria Seciu as Pusa
 Gelu Colceag as Mr. Livinski
 Luminița Gheorghiu as Mioara Avram
 Gigi Ifrim as neighbour
 Lucian Ifrim
 Carmela Culda
 Ileana Puiu as Olguța
 Catrinel Dumitrescu as Mrs. Livinski

Synopsis
The main character, Viorel, is divorced.  He does not handle the divorce very well.  In a car park, he murders the notary that represented his former wife, along with the woman who happens to be with the notary.  He then murders his former in-laws.  At the end, he turns himself in to the police, confessing to the murders.  The film follows him as he prepares for the murders, buying the illegally made firing pins, taking a shower while pushing two fingers in his anus and purchasing a shotgun.

Production
Production was led by the Romanian company Mandragora, and co-produced by France's Société Française de Coproduction, Switzerland's Bord Cadre Films and Germany's Essential Filmproduktion. The total production budget was 2 million Euro, including 380,000 Euro from the Romanian National Center of Cinematography and 250,000 Euro from Eurimages. Puiu spent five months searching for an appropriate lead actor before deciding to cast himself. Since the role involved several driving scenes he had to get a driving licence before filming could begin. Filming took place between February and May 2009.

See also
 Romanian New Wave

References

External links
 
 

2010 films
Romanian drama films
2010s Romanian-language films
Films directed by Cristi Puiu
Films set in Bucharest
Films about divorce